The final of the 2007 ICC Cricket World Cup was played on 28 April 2007 at the Kensington Oval, Barbados. Australia defeated Sri Lanka by 53 runs (under the Duckworth–Lewis method) to win their 4th World Cup and 3rd in succession.

Road to the final
Australia reached the final by defeating South Africa by 7 wickets, while Sri Lanka reached the final by defeating New Zealand by 81 runs in the semi-finals.

Details
This was the first World Cup final to be a repeat – the sides previously met in the 1996 World Cup Final, which Sri Lanka won. Australia has won every World Cup match against Sri Lanka apart from that loss. The match was Sri Lanka's second World Cup final appearance and Australia's sixth, their fourth in a row.

Ricky Ponting won the toss and elected to bat. However, the start of play was delayed due to rain, and the match was reduced to 38 overs per side. Adam Gilchrist's score of 149 – the highest in a World Cup final – helped give Australia an imposing total of 281. Sri Lankan batsmen Kumar Sangakkara and Sanath Jayasuriya added 116 for the second wicket, before falling with the score at 123 and 145 respectively. Despite the regular loss of wickets, Sri Lanka managed to maintain a run rate of over 6 an over. Further rain forced the reduction of Sri Lanka's innings to just 36 overs, with the target revised to 269. At the culmination of the 33rd over, with Sri Lanka still trailing the adjusted Duckworth-Lewis target by 37 runs, the umpires suspended the game due to bad light.

While Australia's players began to celebrate their victory (since the minimum 20 overs had been reached), the umpires incorrectly announced that because the match was suspended due to light and not rain, the final three overs would have to be bowled the following day. With Sri Lanka needing 61 runs from 18 deliveries, Jayawardene agreed there was no need to return the following day, and instructed his team to resume batting, with Ponting agreeing to bowl only spinners. The last three overs were played in almost complete darkness, during which Sri Lanka added nine runs, giving Australia a 53-run victory via the Duckworth–Lewis method.
The umpires later apologised for their error, and stated that the match should have ended then with Australia winning by 37 runs.

Australia won the tournament undefeated, and established a streak of 29 World Cup games without a loss. Australian bowler Glenn McGrath was named Player of the Series.

Scorecard
1st innings

Fall of wickets: 1–172 (Hayden, 22.5 ov), 2–224 (Gilchrist, 30.3 ov), 3–261 (Ponting, 35.4 ov), 4–266 (Watson, 36.2 ov)

2nd innings

Fall of wickets: 1–7 (Tharanga, 2.1 ov), 2–123 (Sangakkara, 19.5 ov), 3–145 (Jayasuriya, 22.6 ov), 4–156 (Jayawardene, 25.5 ov), 5–188 (Dilshan, 29.6 ov), 6–190 (Silva, 30.1 ov), 7–194 (Arnold, 31.5 ov), 8–211 (Malinga, 33.6 ov)

External links
2007 Cricket World Cup website
ICC Overview of 2007 World Cup
ICC website – Cricket World Cup page
Cricinfo – Cricket World Cup 2007

References

Final, 2007 Cricket World Cup
Cricket World Cup Finals
2007 in Barbadian sport
21st century in Bridgetown
Sport in Bridgetown